The 2001–02 Michigan State Spartans men's basketball team represented Michigan State University in the 2001–02 NCAA Division I men's basketball season. They were coached by Tom Izzo in his seventh season. The Spartans  played their home games at Breslin Center in East Lansing, Michigan and were members of the Big Ten Conference. MSU finished the regular season 19–12, 10–6 to finish in a tie for fourth place in the Big Ten. The Spartans received a bid to the NCAA tournament for the fifth consecutive year where they lost in the First Round to NC State.

Previous season 
The Spartans finished the 2000–01 season 28–5, 13–3 in Big Ten play to finish in second place. Michigan State received a No. 1 seed in the NCAA tournament, their fourth straight trip to the Tournament, and advanced the Final Four, their third straight trip under Tom Izzo.

The Spartans lost Charlie Bell (13.5 PPG, 4.7 RPG, 5.1 APG) to graduation and freshman Zach Randolph (10.8 PPG, 6.7 RPG, 1.0 APG) and sophomore Jason Richardson (14.7 PPG, 5.9 RPG, 2.2 APG) to the NBA draft following the season.

Season summary 
After three consecutive years of trips to the Final Four, the Spartans began the season ranked No. 15 in the AP Poll. Michigan State was led by sophomore Marcus Taylor (16.8 points and 5.3 assists per game), freshman Chris Hill (11.5 points per game), and junior Adam Ballinger (11.2 points and 6.8 rebounds per game). The Spartans participated in the Preseason NIT where they defeated Detroit Mercy and No. 24 Oklahoma at Breslin Center, but then fell to No. 18 Syracuse and No. 23 Fresno State at Madison Square Garden. The Spartans also suffered non-conference losses to No. 6 Florida and No. 16 Stanford, but did beat No. 6 Arizona in a rematch of their Final Four clash the previous Spring. MSU finished the non-conference season at 9–4 and ranked No. 19 in the country.

In Big Ten play, MSU started the season with three straight losses, the last to Wisconsin, which snapped MSU's 53-game home winning streak. The Spartans did defeat No. 12 Illinois, No. 18 Ohio State at home and on the road, and No. 23 Indiana. Michigan State finished the conference schedule at 10–6 and in fourth place with an overall record of 19–10. The Spartans slipped out of the ranking following their opening conference losses and remained unranked the remainder of the season. MSU lost in the quarterfinals of the Big Ten tournament to No. 23 Indiana marking the first time since 1997 that Michigan State did not win either the Big Ten regular season or tournament title.

The Spartans received an at-large bid as a No. 10 seed in the NCAA Tournament, their fifth consecutive trip. The Spartans were eliminated in the First Round by NC State.

Following the season, sophomore Marcus Taylor declared for the NBA draft.

Roster

Schedule and results

|-
!colspan=9 style=| Exhibition

|-
!colspan=9 style=| Non-conference regular season

|-
!colspan=9 style=|Big Ten regular season

|-
!colspan=9 style=|Big Ten tournament

|-
!colspan=9 style=|NCAA tournament

Rankings

Awards and honors 
 Marcus Taylor – All-Big Ten First Team
 Marcus Taylor – USBWA All-District Team
 Adam Ballinger – All-Big Ten Third Team (Media)

References

Michigan State Spartans men's basketball seasons
Michigan State Spartans
2001 in sports in Michigan
2002 in sports in Michigan
Michigan State